Ajara is a census town and the taluka headquarters of Ajara taluka in Kolhapur district in the state of Maharashtra, India.

Geography 

It is known for its scenic and green landscape, as well as for its Ajara Ghansaal rice.

Ajara is 84 km from Kolhapur and 33 km from Amboli Hill station. The nearest major city is Gadhinglaj.

Demographics
, Ajara had a population of 18,000. Males constitute 51% of the population and females 49%. Ajara has an average literacy rate of 75%, higher than the national average of 59.5%; with 55% of males and 45% of females literate. 12% of the population is under 6 years of age. Marathi is predominantly spoken.

Places To Visit 
Places such as Ramtirth waterfall, a lord Rama temple on the Hiranyakeshi river and Ravalnath temple are located nearby.

See also
Pedrewadi
Haloli

References

Cities and towns in Kolhapur district
Talukas in Maharashtra